The European Society of Criminology is a learned society dedicated to criminology in Europe. It was established in 2000, with its original goals including the creation of working groups on specific topics, one of the first being juvenile justice. Since 2004, it has published the European Journal of Criminology along with SAGE Publications. Since 2001, the society has held annual conferences, the first of which was held in Lausanne.

References

External links 

 Official website

Criminology organizations
Organizations established in 2000